Trochus calcaratus, common name the actor top shell, is a species of sea snail, a marine gastropod mollusk in the family Trochidae, the top snails.

The name Trochus histrio was not well described by Reeve, and as was his custom in Trochus, only a back view was given by Reeve, so that positive identification is difficult.

Description
The size of the shell varies between 18 mm and 40 mm. The solid, false-umbilicate shell has an elate-conic shape. The spire has nearly rectilinear outlines. The about 9 whorls are planulate, the body whorl is carinated. The sculpture of the upper surface consists of spiral series, four or five on each whorl, of regular, closely arranged granules, which are either rounded, bead-like, or laterally compressed. Upon the periphery of each whorl, there is a row of radiating, minutely perforated pustules, numbering on the body whorl 28. The base of the shell is concentrically sculptured with 6 to 7 concentric, densely granose lirae. It is slightly convex, radiately striped with brown or purplish. The color of the upper surface is whitish, broadly striped with red, purplish or brown. It is usually blue when rubbed. The aperture is lirate within on outer and parietal walls. The  basal margin is concave, thick, and dentate within. The columella is oblique, plicate within and quadridentate. The white umbilical tract is  biplicate.

This species is principally distinguished by the fistulous or perforated peripheral tubercles.

Distribution
This species occurs on coral reefs and in the low and shallow subtidal zone in the Western and Central Pacific Ocean. In Australian waters it occurs off the Northern Territory, Queensland and Western Australia.

References

 Reeve, L.A. 1848. Descriptions of new species of Trochus and Turbo, chiefly from the collection of H. Cuming. Proceedings of the Zoological Society of London 1848: 49-52
 Philippi, R.A. 1855. Trochidae. pp. 249–328 in Küster, H.C. (ed). Systematisches Conchylien-Cabinet von Martini und Chemnitz. Nürnberg : Bauer & Raspe Vol. 2.
 Lischke, C.E. 1869. Japanische Meeres-Conchylien. Ein beitrag zur kenntniss der Mollusken Japan's, mit besonderer rücksicht auf die geographische vertreitung derselben. Cassel : Fischer Vol. 1 192 pp., 14 pls.
 Hedley, C. 1907. The Mollusca of Mast Head Reef, Capricorn Group, Queensland, part II. Proceedings of the Linnean Society of New South Wales 32: 476-513, pls 16-21
 Oliver, W.R.B. 1915. The Mollusca of the Kermadec Islands. Transactions of the New Zealand Institute 47: 509-568
 Demond, J. 1957. Micronesian reef associated gastropods. Pacific Science 11(3): 275-341, fig. 2, pl. 1.
 MacNeil, F.S. 1960. Tertiary and Quaternary Gastropoda of Okinawa. United States Geological Survey Professional Papers 339: i-iv, 1-148, 19 pls
 Ladd, H.S. 1966. Chitons and gastropods (Haliotidae through Adeorbidae) from the western Pacific Islands. United States Geological Survey Professional Papers 531: 1-98 16 pls 
 Salvat, B. & Rives, C. 1975. Coquillages de Polynésie. Tahiti : Papeete les editions du pacifique, pp. 1–391
 Tantanasiriwong, R. 1978. An illustrated checklist of marine shelled gastropods from Phuket Island, adjacent mainland and offshore islands, Western Peninsula, Thailand. Phuket Marine Biological Center, Research Bulletin 21: 1-22, 259 figs 
 Cernohorsky, W.O. 1978. Tropical Pacific marine shells. Sydney : Pacific Publications 352 pp., 68 pls. 
 Wells, F.E. & Bryce, C.W. 1986. Seashells of Western Australia. Perth : Western Australian Museum 207 pp. 
 Wilson, B. 1993. Australian Marine Shells. Prosobranch Gastropods. Kallaroo, Western Australia : Odyssey Publishing Vol. 1 408 pp.
 Herbert D.G. (1996) A critical review of the trochoidean types in the Muséum d'Histoire naturelle, Bordeaux (Mollusca, Gastropoda). Bulletin du Muséum national d'Histoire naturelle, Paris, ser. 4, 18 (A, 3-4): 409-445.

External links
 To World Register of Marine Species
 

calcaratus
Gastropods described in 1874